Margaret Trevana Martin (1905-2000) was a British botanist and phycologist noted for identifying several species of South African Rhodophyceae.

Career 
She worked at University College of North Wales, Bangor.

In 1937 she was inducted into the Linnean Society of London.

Martin was a co-founder of the British Phycological Society with her friend and fellow phycologist Kathleen Mary Drew-Baker and later served as Vice President of the organisation.

Her collection of algal specimens is house in the herbarium of the National Museum of Wales in Cardiff.

Author abbreviation

Works

References 

1905 births
British women scientists
British botanists
British phycologists
Women phycologists
Year of death missing